The Katu people (also Co Tu, Ca Tang; ;) are an ethnic group of about 102,551 who live in eastern Laos and central Vietnam. Numbered among the Katuic peoples, they speak a Mon-Khmer language.

Laos
The Katu in Laos live in Sekong Province along the upper Sekong River and in the highland basin of the Song Boung river watershed along the border with Vietnam's Quảng Nam and Thừa Thiên–Huế Provinces. There were 28,378 of them in Laos in 2015.

Vietnam

The Vietnamese government's official name for the Katu ethnic group is "Co Tu". Within Vietnam, most Katu live in the provinces of Thừa Thiên–Huế and Quảng Nam. The Katu in Vietnam numbered 50,458 in the 1999 census, 61,588 in the 2009 census, and 74,173 in the 2019 census.

The Katu typically serve rice cooked in bamboo stems such as zăr, aví hor, koo dep, koo g'đhoong, and cha chắc, and drink a beverage called tavak. Their famous dances are tung tung (performed by males) and ya yá (performed by females). They play h'roa in ordinary life. Traditional Katu homes are on stilts and those who live on the Laotian border are known for growing jute and weaving. Some 15,000 Katu in Thừa Thiên–Huế speak Phuong, a Katuic dialect often recognized as a separate language.

References

Lưu Hùng. 2007. A contribution to Katu ethnography. Hanoi: Nhà xuất bản Thế Giới.

Indigenous peoples of Southeast Asia
Ethnic groups in Vietnam
Ethnic groups in Laos